Ruvimbo Brenda Mutyavaviri (born 8 December 1986) is a Zimbabwean footballer who plays as a defender. She has been a member of the Zimbabwe women's national team.

International career
Mutyavaviri capped for Zimbabwe at senior level during the 2016 Africa Women Cup of Nations.

References

1986 births
Living people
Zimbabwean women's footballers
Zimbabwe women's international footballers
Women's association football defenders